Rušanj (Serbian Cyrillic: Рушањ) is a suburban settlement of Belgrade, Serbia. It is located in the municipality of Čukarica.

Rušanj is located south of Belgrade, on the right side of the Ibarska magistrala freeway. It is statistically classified as a rural settlement, which experienced accelerated growth in period 1970s-1990s. Population of Rušanj:

 1971 - <2,000
 1981 - 3,610
 1991 - 4,457
 2002 - 4,769

The settlement stretches in two forks, to the north and to the east, and each one is connected by separate bus lines (531 and 532) with downtown Belgrade.

References

External links

Suburbs of Belgrade
Čukarica